"There's No Way" is a song written by John Jarrard, Lisa Palas and Will Robinson, and recorded by American country music band Alabama.  It was released in January 1985 as the first single from the band's album 40-Hour Week.

Content
The song is a love ballad, and an example of the pop-styled aspect of Alabama's core musical style.

Music video
The music video was directed by David Hogan and premiered in early 1985.It first premiered on CMT

A record tied
When "There's No Way" reached No. 1 on the Billboard magazine Hot Country Singles chart in May 1985, it became Alabama's 16th straight No. 1 single in as many single releases (excepting for the 1982 Christmas single "Christmas in Dixie"). The feat allowed Alabama to tie Sonny James' 14-year-old record for most No. 1 songs in as many consecutive single releases.

Charts

Weekly charts

Year-end charts

References

Sources
 Morris, Edward, "Alabama," Contemporary Books Inc., Chicago, 1985
 Roland, Tom, "The Billboard Book of Number One Country Hits" (Billboard Books, Watson-Guptill Publications, New York, 1991)

1985 singles
Alabama (American band) songs
Song recordings produced by Harold Shedd
RCA Records Nashville singles
Songs written by John Jarrard
Songs written by Will Robinson (songwriter)
1985 songs